Heat shock protein 47, also known as SERPINH1 is a serpin which serves as a human chaperone protein for collagen.

Function 

This protein is a member of the serpin superfamily of serine proteinase inhibitors. Its expression is induced by heat shock. HSP47 is expressed in the endoplasmic reticulum. These cells synthesize and secrete type I and type II collagen.  The protein localizes to the endoplasmic reticulum lumen and binds collagen; thus it is thought to be a molecular chaperone involved in the maturation of collagen molecules. Autoantibodies to this protein have been found in patients with rheumatoid arthritis.

Interactions 

Heat shock protein 47 has been shown to interact with collagens I, II, III, IV and V.

References

Further reading

External links 
 The MEROPS online database for peptidases and their inhibitors: I04.035
 

Molecular chaperones